Matthew Rouillon (born 17 February 2005) is a Seychellois footballer who currently plays for Rovers FC and the Seychelles national team.

Club career
As a youth Rouillon played for Futuro Sports Sesel. In preparation for the 2020 season, he scored three goals in two matches, including two against the U18 squad of Mont Fleuri FC and another against Plaisance FC. In 2020 he went on to join Rovers FC, the parent club of Futuro Sesel. In July 2022 Rouillon travelled to France for a trial with SC Air Bel in Marseille.

International career
Rouillon was called up to the senior national team for a friendly tournament in Comoros in September 2021. At age 16 he went on to make his senior international debut on 1 September 2021 in the Seychelles' opening loss to Comoros.

International career statistics

References

External links
National Football Teams profile
Rovers FC profile

2005 births
Living people
Association football forwards
Seychellois footballers
Seychelles international footballers